Niketas was a 7th-century Byzantine officer. He was the son and heir of the Sassanid Persian general and briefly shahanshah, Shahrbaraz.

Biography
Niketas was the son of Shahrbaraz, a famous Persian general who had led Sassanid armies in Syria, Anatolia, and Egypt during the Byzantine–Sassanid War of 602–628. After the war ended, Shahrbaraz remained in control of Egypt and the Levant lands, until in end 628 he handed them back to the Byzantine emperor Heraclius in exchange for Byzantine support in his own bid for the Persian throne. To conclude the pact, Niketas, who was recognized as Shahrbaraz' heir by Heraclius, was given the Byzantine rank of patrikios, while his sister Nike was married to Theodosios, one of Heraclius' sons. Niketas and another of his brothers came to live in the Byzantine court, practically as hostages. As a token of their alliance, in summer/early autumn 629, Niketas returned the Christian relics of the Holy Sponge and the Holy Lance to Heraclius from Jerusalem, then still under control of Shahrbaraz's Persian troops. It is probable that at this time, Niketas converted to Christianity; as he was his father's heir-apparent, this opened the prospect of the Christianization of Persia should Shahrbaraz be able to maintain his power there.

Following his father's murder, Niketas remained in Byzantine service, and re-appears in 636 as one of the many Byzantine commanders during the Battle of Yarmouk against the Muslim Arabs, although which army he led is unknown. He survived the Byzantine defeat at Yarmouk and fled to Emesa, from where he contacted the Caliph Umar. Niketas allegedly offered to help the Arabs conquer Persia, but Umar distrusted him and had him executed.

References

Sources
 
 

636 deaths
7th-century Iranian people
7th-century Byzantine people
Byzantine generals
Byzantine people of the Arab–Byzantine wars
Year of birth unknown
People executed by the Rashidun Caliphate
Patricii
House of Mihran
Converts to Christianity from Zoroastrianism
Heirs apparent who never acceded
Byzantine people of Iranian descent